Nataliya Gennadievna Vdovina (born 12 January 1969) is a Russian film and stage actress. She is best known for her performance as mother in The Return. She also won several awards for her performance on stage.

Biography
Natalia Vdovina was born in Belogorsk, Crimea, Soviet Union (now Republic of Crimea, Russia). In 1990 she graduated from the Mikhail Shchepkin Higher Theatre School and was accepted into the troupe of the theater "Satyricon" named after Arkady Raikin.

Natalia has two children: a daughter, Maya and a son, Roman.

Awards
Artist of the Russian Federation (2001)
Laureate of the Moscow Prize in Literature and Art (1999)
Laureate of Moscow's highest theater prize, the Crystal Turandot (1994)
twice winner of the Russian theater prize the Seagull Award (2001, 2006)

Selected filmography

Film

Television

References

External links 

1969 births
Living people
People from Bilohirsk Raion
Russian film actresses
Russian television actresses
Russian stage actresses
20th-century Russian actresses
21st-century Russian actresses
Honored Artists of the Russian Federation